Víceměřice is a municipality and village in Prostějov District in the Olomouc Region of the Czech Republic. It has about 600 inhabitants.

Notable people
Helena Fibingerová (born 1949), shot putter, Olympic medalist

References

Villages in Prostějov District